Datura leichhardtii is a species of thorn apple in the genus Datura. In 1844, Ludwig Leichhardt is said to have discovered this species in Australia. Ferdinand von Mueller gave it the name Datura leichhardtii when he published his first description of it in 1855.

The natural habitat of this species covered an area from Mexico to Guatemala. It was taken to Australia, where today is widespread in Queensland, the Northern Territory and New South Wales. The plant is extremely fond of heat, and its preferred habitat is close to rivers and streams. Datura leichhardtii grows into a bush from 1.5 to 3 ft tall. The plants are green and a bit furry, with inconspicuous yellowish white flowers. The spiny seed capsule is about 1.5 in. in diameter.

The plant is not found in cultivation, because its flowers have no ornamental value.

Toxicity

All parts of Datura plants contain dangerous levels of poison and may be fatal if ingested by humans or other animals, including livestock and pets. In some places it is prohibited to buy, sell or cultivate Datura plants.

Gallery

References

External links
 Photo of Datura leichhardtii

leichhardtii
Flora of Mexico
Flora of Guatemala
Taxa named by Ferdinand von Mueller
Taxa named by George Bentham